Rupert Edward Pearce (born March 1964) is a British lawyer and was formerly the chief executive of the satellite communication company Inmarsat.

He was previously a lawyer with Linklaters.

Pearce earned an MA in Modern History from Oxford University and graduated from Georgetown University Law Center in Washington, DC.

References 

1964 births
Living people
British chief executives
Alumni of the University of Oxford
British lawyers
Georgetown University Law Center alumni